The Marshall Master is a minibus body built on Mercedes-Benz Vario chassis by Marshall Bus of Cambridge, England between 1997 and 1999.

The Master was the successor to the C16 and C19 bodies on the Mercedes-Benz T2 chassis, and was essentially a minibus version of the Capital single-deck body, having a largely similar rear end, front destination display, and side window arrangement.

A total of 53 were built, the biggest customer being First Essex with 15. Coakley Bus of Motherwell took nine, while Dart Buses of Paisley bought five. The remainder were mostly sold to small operators.

Gallery

See also

 List of buses

Buses of the United Kingdom
Vehicles introduced in 1997